Erik Bødtker Øyno (born 1965) is a Norwegian businessperson and chief executive officer of Aktiv Kapital.

Øyno holds a siviløkonom degree from the Norwegian School of Economics and Business Administration, and has been CEO of Byggmakker and director of investments at ABN Amro.

References

1965 births
Living people
Norwegian businesspeople
Norwegian School of Economics alumni